John Barron (24 December 1920 – 3 July 2004) was an English actor. Although Barron was a familiar face on British television from the 1950s, he is best remembered for his role in the BBC comedy The Fall and Rise of Reginald Perrin (1976–79) playing C J, Perrin's overbearing boss, later employee. The show also gave Barron the memorable catchphrase, "I didn't get where I am today by...".

Biography
Born in Marylebone, London, Barron was interested in acting from an early age. For his 18th birthday, his godfather paid his entry fee to RADA. After serving as a Lieutenant in the Royal Navy during the Second World War, he returned to stage acting. In the 1950s, he moved into a directorial role, during which time he came to know Leonard Rossiter.

From the mid-1950s, he became more involved in television, and then film. His movies including The Day the Earth Caught Fire (1961), Jigsaw (1962), Incense for the Damned (1970), Hitler: The Last Ten Days (1973), Clash of Loyalties (1983), To Catch a King (1984) and Thirteen at Dinner (1985). During his career, he also appeared in such popular TV series as Crown Court, The Avengers, Emergency – Ward 10, All Gas and Gaiters, Undermind, The Saint, Department S, Doomwatch, Timeslip, Potter, To the Manor Born, Whoops Apocalypse and Yes Minister. Although he had long-running roles in popular dramas like the police series Softly, Softly (where he played the assistant chief constable between 1967 and 1969), his best known role was in the situation comedy The Fall and Rise of Reginald Perrin, which began in 1976, and starred Leonard Rossiter as the title character. Barron's character, CJ (Charles Jefferson), was Perrin's overbearing boss with the catchphrase "I didn't get where I am today by...". He also appeared in the 1986 Christmas Special of Duty Free.

Barron was president of the actors' union Equity from 1978 to 1982 and vice-president in 1977 and again from 1984 to 1989. His one hobby was enjoying fine wine, which he also inspired his friend Rossiter to take up. An active supporter of the Conservative Party, he presented a Party Political Broadcast on their behalf in the 1980s and features supporting his party's policies on the BBC's Newsnight programme.

He was married three times: first to the actress Joan Sterndale-Bennett which soon ended in divorce; then to Joan Peart, who died in 1989 after 40 years of marriage; and finally to Helen Christie, who died in 1995. He had two stepdaughters, one each from the second and third marriages. Barron remained active in the profession until his death at the age of 83.

Filmography

Film

Television

References

External links
 

1920 births
2004 deaths
Alumni of RADA
English male television actors
People from Marylebone
Royal Navy officers of World War II